Hnyigarok is a coastal village in Ye Township in the Mon State of south-east Burma.

Nearby towns and villages include Daminzeik Auk (11.2 nm), Zayat (7.1 nm), Thingangyun (1.4 nm), Andin (1.0 nm) and Saiye (1.0 nm).

Populated places in Mon State